Smodicinodes is a genus of spiders in the family Thomisidae. It was first described in 1993 by Ono. , it contains 4 species from China.

References

Thomisidae
Araneomorphae genera
Spiders of China